The 1975–76 season was the 30th season in FK Partizan's existence. This article shows player statistics and matches that the club played during the 1975–76 season.

Players

Squad information
(league matches/league goals)

Momčilo Vukotić (33/7)Rešad Kunovac (33/0)Borislav Đurović (32/1)Radmilo Ivančević (32/0)Nenad Bjeković (31/24)Ilija Zavišić (31/6)Refik Kozić (30/0)Ivan Golac (26/0)Aranđel Todorović (25/2)Boško Đorđević (23/5)Predrag Tomić (23/1)Vukan Perović (19/7)Vladimir Pejović (19/0)Dragan Arsenović (16/1)Svemir Đorđić (14/1)Nenad Stojković (14/0)Pavle Grubješić (12/3)Aleksandar Trifunović (8/0)Radomir Antić (7/1)Blagoj Istatov (3/0)Sima Nikolić (3/0)Xhevat Prekazi (3/0)Nenad Cvetković (1/0)

Friendlies

Competitions

Yugoslav First League

Matches

Yugoslav Cup

Statistics

Goalscorers 
This includes all competitive matches.

Score overview

See also
 List of FK Partizan seasons

References

External links
 Official website
 Partizanopedia 1975-76  (in Serbian)

FK Partizan seasons
Partizan
Yugoslav football championship-winning seasons